The Northern Tioga School District is a rural public school district operating in Tioga County, Pennsylvania, US. Northern Tioga School District is a third class school district having less than 30,000 residents and is one of the 500 public school districts of Pennsylvania. Municipalities served include: Tioga, Tioga Township, Jackson Township, Lawrenceville, Lawrence Township, Farmington Township, Elkland, Osceola Township, Knoxville, Chatham Township, Deerfield Township, Brookfield, Westfield, and Clymer Township. According to 2000 federal census data, it served a resident population of 14,670. By 2010, the district's population declined to 14,523 people. The educational attainment levels for the Northern Tioga School District population (25 years old and over) were 85.6% high school graduates and 11.7% college graduates.

Northern Tioga School District operates three elementary schools: Westfield Elementary School (K-6), Clark Wood Elementary School (K-6) and R.B. Walter Elementary School (K-6). The high schools consist of grades 7–12 with integrated middle schools. The secondary program is housed in two high schools: Cowanesque Valley Junior Senior High School and Williamson Senior High School. Elkland Area High School was closed in 2011 due to low enrollment. High school students do not have access to a vocational training school.

According to the Pennsylvania Budget and Policy Center, 44.6% of the district's pupils lived at 185% or below the Federal Poverty Level  as shown by their eligibility for the federal free or reduced price school meal programs in 2012. In 2009, the district residents’ per capita income was $14,920, while the median family income was $35,792. In the Commonwealth, the median family income was $49,501 and the United States median family income was $49,445, in 2010. In Tioga County, the median household income was $40.338.

Extracurriculars
The Northern Tioga School District offers an extensive program of after school clubs, arts programs and an interscholastic athletics program. 
Williamson High School sports
The district funds:

Boys
Baseball – A
Basketball- A
Soccer – A
Track and Field – AA
Wrestling – AA

Girls
Basketball – AA
Cheerleading – AAAA
Soccer (Fall) – A
Softball – A
Track and Field – AA
Volleyball – A

Junior High School Sports

Boys
Basketball
Soccer
Track and Field
Wrestling	

Girls
Basketball
Soccer (Fall)
Track and Field
Volleyball

According to PIAA directory July 2015 

Cowanesque Valley Junior Senior High School sports

Boys
Baseball – A
Basketball – A
Cross Country – AA
Football – A
Golf – AA
Tennis – AA
Track and Field – AA

Girls
Basketball – A
Cross Country – AA
Golf – AA
Softball – A
Girls' Tennis – AA
Track and Field 
Volleyball – A

Junior High School Sports

Boys
Basketball
Cross Country
Football
Track and Field	

Girls
Basketball
Cross Country
Track and Field
Volleyball

References

School districts in Tioga County, Pennsylvania